Fatick is the southwest region of the northern outcrop of Senegal. Its alternative name is Jinnak Bolon. The region is named for its capital city, Fatick.

History

The area is rich with Serer ancient and medieval history. Many of the ancient Serer sites are found within this region. It is also one of the holy places in the Serer religion. The Xooy Ceremony (or Khoy), a divination festival by the Serer priestly class (the Saltigues) is held within this region once a year. The population is overrun by the Serer people. Historically, it was part of the Serer pre-colonial Kingdom of Sine. In 1859, the Battle of Logandème took place within this region. It was a battle of resistance by the Siin-Siin (Serer people of Sine) against French colonialism. It is called in some French scholarly works as the Battle of Fatick.

Departments
Fatick region is divided into 3 departments :
Fatick Département
Foundiougne Département
Gossas Département

References

External links 
Fatick region map
La Region de Fatick

 
Regions of Senegal